Adada Enna Azhagu is a 2009 Tamil-language romance film directed by T. M. Jayamurugan. The film stars Jai Akash and newcomer Nicole, with Sarath Babu, Ashish Vidyarthi, Karunas, Aishwarya, Rekha, Aarthi and Mahadevan playing supporting roles. It was released on 20 March 2009. The film was also dubbed into Telugu as Aaha Entha Andam and into Hindi as Tum Ho Sabse Haseen.

Plot

Vasan (Jai Akash) is the son of the psychiatrist Vaikam (Sarath Babu), who runs a mental hospital while Nisha (Nicole) is the daughter of the Defence Minister Alexander (Ashish Vidyarthi). Vasan is an avid fan of music but he pursues a MBBS course for fulfilling his father's wish. Before the graduation ceremony, Vasan shares with his friend (Karunas) the best moments he had during his college life. Last year, Nisha (Nicole) joined the medical college as a last year student. Vasan fell in love at first sight with his co-student Nisha and they even became friends. Nisha eventually fell in love with him but they couldn't express their love.

At the graduation ceremony, Vasan and Nisha received gold medals from the hands of their fathers but they still cannot declare their love. One day, goons try to kidnap Nisha and her father saves her but, in the process, Nisha suffers a head injury. She is admitted to Vaikam's hospital as a mental patient. Vaikam suggests her father that music therapy might cure her mental illness and Vasan cures her by singing a song. Alexander is grateful to them so he is ready to give them anything in return for saving his daughter. Vasan and his parents then make a marriage proposal and Vasan tells Alexander that he was in love with Nisha. Alexander, who thinks that money and prestige are more important than anything else, turns down the offers and insults them. Thereafter, Vasan kidnaps Nisha but Alexander uses his powers and they are caught: Nisha is locked in her bedroom while Vasan is held by police officers.

Vasan manages to escape from the police and releases his lover Nisha. Goons who want to kidnap Nisha, Alexander's henchmen and police officers are in pursuit of the young lovers. Afterwards, Alexander changes his mind and approves for their love marriage.

Cast

Jai Akash as Vasan
Nicole as Nisha
Sarath Babu as Vaikam
Ashish Vidyarthi as Alexander
Karunas as Vasan's friend
Aishwarya as Diana, Nisha's mother
Rekha as Vasan's mother
Aarthi as Nisha's friend
Mahadevan as Mahadevan
Sathya Prakash
A. Mathiazhagan
Chitti Babu as Security guard
Unistar Manohar as Security guard
LIC Narasimhan
Vimalathithan
Kaviyanban
N. Sundarrajan
Bellie as Bellie
Jasmin
Vengal Rao
Raghuvaran as himself (cameo appearance)

Production
T. M. Jayamurugan who directed Roja Malare (1997) made his return with Adada Enna Azhagu. He had also wielded the music baton for the film and added that the film is much more than just an ordinary love story. Jai Akash, who took a hiatus of four years from acting in Tamil Cinema, signed to play the hero of the film while debutante Nicole was selected to play the heroine. Noted actor, Raghuvaran, died during the production of the film and he was replaced by actor Sarath Babu.

Soundtrack

The film score and the soundtrack were composed by T. M. Jayamurugan and Jeevan Thomas. The soundtrack, released in 2009, features 7 tracks with lyrics written by T. M. Jayamurugan.

Release
The film was released on 20 March 2009 alongside the dubbed versions of Arundhati and Khoon Ka Karz (Arasan : The Don).

Critical reception
Sify said, "There is nothing to recommend in the film. Keep away". A reviewer rated the film 1.75 out of 5 and stated, "The director has come out with a routine romantic tale and though the presentation was somewhat okay, the narrative lacked the finesse". Behindwoods.com rated the film 0.5 out of 5 and wrote, "Adada Enna Azhagu is so fake and out of place that you end up feeling you are time-transported two decades earlier". The dubbed version of the film also received a negative review with a critic stating, "This movie is lousier than all its individual lousinesses put together, and believe us, that's an unbelievable amount of lousy".

Box office
The film took a below average opening at the Chennai box office.

References

2009 films
2000s Tamil-language films
Indian romance films
2009 romance films